The mixed 50 metre rifle, prone was a shooting sports event held as part of the Shooting at the 1976 Summer Olympics programme. It was the thirteenth appearance of the event. The competition was held on 19 July 1976 at the shooting ranges in Montreal. 78 shooters from 45 nations competed.

Results

References

Shooting at the 1976 Summer Olympics
Men's 050m prone 1976